Sergey Makarov (born 28 March 1980) is a Russian male volleyball player. He was part of the Russia men's national volleyball team at the 2014 FIVB Volleyball Men's World Championship in Poland. He played for Kuzbass. In 2011, as a part of the national team, Makarov won the World Cup.

Clubs
 MGFSO (Today, the "Dynamo") (1996/97, 2000/01)
 Dynamo Moscow (2001/02, 2003/04)
 Iskra (2004/05) 
 Dynamo Moscow (2005/07)
 Locomotiv Novosibirsk (2007/09) 
 Iskra (2009/11) 
 Fakel (2011/12) 
 Belogorie (2012/13)  
 Kuzbass (2014-)

References

1980 births
Living people
Russian men's volleyball players
Place of birth missing (living people)
20th-century Russian people
21st-century Russian people